Chop Cut Rebuild is an automotive documentary-lifestyle series. The show is the creation of its host Canadian actor Dan Woods who was previously known for his role as Principal Daniel Raditch in the Degrassi teen drama franchise. The series is produced by Dan Woods and Edward Peghin and directed by Edward Peghin. In 2012, Dan Woods and Edward Peghin were nominated for a Daytime Emmy award for Outstanding Lifestyle Program.

Broadcast history
The series was first shown on Speed Channel from 2004 through 2013. On March 5, 2013, Fox Sports announced that it would relaunch Speed Channel as Fox Sports 1 on August 17, 2013, with significant changes in programming but retaining NASCAR coverage. On June 21, 2013, Fox Sports 1 announced that a number of series that aired on Speed Channel would not be part of the new channel's line up, and this included Chop Cut Rebuild.

Starting April 8, 2014, Chop Cut Rebuild began appearing on MAVTV, and new episodes are broadcast through 2017.

Notes

External links
Official website; last update in 2017
Chop Cut Rebuild at MAVTV.com

Automotive television series
2004 American television series debuts